The 1934 Green Bay Packers season was the franchise 's 16th season overall, 14th season in the National Football League, and the 16th under head coach  Curly Lambeau. The team improved on their 5–7–1 record from 1933 and finished with a 7–6 record. The Packers played their Milwaukee, Wisconsin home games at Wisconsin State Fair Park.

During this season, a fan fell from the stands at City Stadium and sued the Packers and won a $5,000 verdict. This caused the insurance company to go out of business and the Packers entered receivership. Green Bay business men raised $15,000 in new capital to prevent the team from folding.

Schedule

Standings

References

Green Bay Packers seasons
Green Bay Packers
Green Bay Packers